The Temple of Israel is a historic synagogue located at 8 Mohawk Place in Amsterdam, Montgomery County, New York.  It was built in 1901 and was designed by Worthy Niver in the Late Victorian and late 19th- and 20th-century revival styles.

The synagogue is a -story, rectangular, eclectic brick building which has an octagonal roof and is topped by an octagonal louvered cupola. It features two turreted towers of unequal height with pyramidal roofs and a rose window with Star of David over three round arch windows.  The building previously served a Reform Jewish congregation.

It was added to the National Register of Historic Places in 1992.

References

External links

Reform synagogues in New York (state)
Synagogues on the National Register of Historic Places in New York (state)
Synagogues completed in 1901
Buildings and structures in Montgomery County, New York
National Register of Historic Places in Montgomery County, New York